The basketball tournament at the 1991 Mediterranean Games was held in Athens, Greece.

Medalists

References
1991 Competition Medalists

Basketball
Basketball at the Mediterranean Games
International basketball competitions hosted by Greece
1991–92 in Greek basketball
1991–92 in European basketball
1991 in Asian basketball
1991 in African basketball